Gordon W. Kruppke (born April 2, 1969) is a Canadian former professional ice hockey player who played 23 games in the National Hockey League for the Detroit Red Wings between 1991 and 1994. The rest of his career, which lasted from 1989 to 1999, was spent in the minor leagues.

Career statistics

Regular season and playoffs

Awards
 WHL East Second All-Star Team – 1989

External links
 

1969 births
Living people
Adirondack Red Wings players
Canadian ice hockey defencemen
Detroit Red Wings draft picks
Detroit Red Wings players
Grand Rapids Griffins players
Houston Aeros (1994–2013) players
Ice hockey people from Alberta
Prince Albert Raiders players
St. John's Maple Leafs players